The Jones Fire was a wildfire in the Willamette National Forest, approximately 10 miles northeast of Lowell, in Oregon in the United States. The fire threatened the community of Lowell and distributed various activities in the park, including the start of deer hunting season.

Events

August
The Jones Fire was reported on August 10, 2017, at approximately 6:51 PM, in the Willamette National Forest, 10 miles northeast of Lowell, Oregon. The fire was started by a lightning strike, fueled by timber and grass. Three days later, on August 13, six campgrounds, two trails, two park areas, and 10 forest service roads were closed. By August 16, the fire was 5% contained and the fire had burned . The fire began burning in areas of the 2003 Clark Fire, creating dangerous conditions for firefighters due to snags. Additionally, firefighters were challenged by steep terrain, poor roads, and limited accessibility to fire lines. Dozers and hand crews completed control lines in the south on August 15. That evening, a public meeting was held in Lowell regarding the fire. On August 20, five people were reported injured by the US Forest Service without explanation of their injuries. 

By August 21, the fire had reached  and was 15% contained. The prior day, the fire had burned through Bedrock Campground, however it did not damage any of the facilities. By August 23, a third trail, four more roads, and two additional park areas were closed.

September

Crews engaged in single tree and small group torching. They controlled a 25-acre spot fire outside the containment line. Additionally, a rock slide temporary closed a fire service at the top of the fire. A red flag warning was put in place. Within a week, by September 7, the fire surpassed . The Jones Fire Camp, located in Lowell State Park, was relocated to Dexter State Recreation Site, closing the site to visitors. 

By the next day, more park areas and roads were closed. Heavy rains continued through mid-September, creating dangerous conditions for fire crews. The weather created slippery, impassible roads, more danger from weakened fire damaged trees, and hiking difficulties. Towards the end of the month, fire suppression began, including chipping roadside material, building waterbars, and removing hazard trees.

October

By October 6, the fire was at 91% containment and fire suppression was the full focus of fire crews. Many recreation sites, trails, and trailheads were reopened. The US Forest Service stopped reporting on the fire.

References

External links

 

2017 Oregon wildfires
Willamette National Forest